Andrew J. Daly (born April 15, 1971) is an American actor, comedian and writer. He starred as Forrest MacNeil on the Comedy Central series Review, and had a supporting role in the HBO comedy series Eastbound & Down as Terrence Cutler. He has also made recurring appearances on television programs such as Silicon Valley, Veep, Modern Family, Black-ish, Trial & Error, the Netflix series The Who Was? Show, Reno 911!, and Comedy Bang! Bang!, as well as animated shows such as Rick and Morty, Solar Opposites, Bob's Burgers, Adventure Time, and Harley Quinn.

Early life and education

Daly was born in Mount Kisco, New York, and was raised in New Jersey. He graduated in 1989 from Ridgewood High School in Ridgewood, New Jersey, and then attended Ithaca College, where he received a bachelor's degree in drama.

Career
After college, Daly moved to New York City, where he performed, along with Andy Secunda, in the sketch comedy duo The Two Andys, which appeared at the 1999 Aspen Comedy Festival. He was also a part of the Mainstage company at Chicago City Limits as an improvisational actor.

When the Upright Citizens Brigade relocated to New York from Chicago in 1996, Daly was one of the first New Yorkers to study improvisation with the group and performed in many of the earliest shows produced by the UCB. He was a member of the long-form improvisation group The Swarm, which was assembled and directed by Amy Poehler.

Television
During the late 1990s, Daly appeared frequently in sketches on Late Night with Conan O'Brien and lent his voice to Robert Smigel's "TV Funhouse" cartoons on Saturday Night Live.

In 2000, Daly joined the cast of MADtv. He was a featured player in the show's sixth season and returned as a full cast member the following season.

He next appeared on television in the main cast of Comedy Central's parody news show Crossballs and later played several different characters on Reno 911!, recurring as "Brad the Friendly Homeowner". He also worked as a correspondent on The Showbiz Show with David Spade for all three seasons and as an advocate on both seasons of Lewis Black's Root of All Evil.

In 2007, Daly appeared as a Benjamin Franklin impersonator in an episode of The Office entitled "Ben Franklin".

In 2008, Daly joined the cast of the HBO series Eastbound & Down as Terrence Cutler. Daly also was the host of the 2008 pilot episode of Match Game.

He made frequent appearances on HBO's The Life and Times of Tim, Adult Swim's Delocated, and IFC's Comedy Bang! Bang! as well as Adventure Time, for which he provided the voices of Wyatt and The King of Ooo. He is also the voice of Krombopolous Michael on Rick and Morty, and Two-Face on Harley Quinn.

Daly appeared in the NBC sitcom The Paul Reiser Show, which was a midseason replacement for the 2010–11 television season. The show was cancelled after two episodes.

Starting in 2014, Daly has guest starred in the ABC sitcom Modern Family as Principal Brown and has also played recurring roles on ABC's Blackish, HBO's Silicon Valley and Veep, and NBC's Trial & Error.

From 2014 to 2017, Daly starred in, executive produced, and wrote episodes of the Comedy Central series Review, which he co-adapted from the Australian series Review with Myles Barlow.

Since 2016, Daly has been the spokesman in commercials for CarMax.

Film
Daly has appeared in numerous films, most notably as courtside announcer Dick Pepperfield in the 2008 film Semi-Pro starring Will Ferrell.

In 2004, Daly appeared in the movie Christmas with the Kranks as a shopper who is bribed by Jamie Lee Curtis' character Nora Krank into giving her a Christmas ham.

In 2010, Daly co-starred as Mayor Brown in the 3D live action/CGI film version of Yogi Bear and appeared in She's Out of My League as Fuller.

He had a small role in the 2011 film, Transformers: Dark of the Moon as a mailroom worker.

In 2016, he played Principal Dwight in Middle School: The Worst Years of My Life which was directed by Steve Carr.

Stand-up comedy
Daly does many different characters in his stand-up. In 2007, a character named "Jerry O'Hearn" was featured on the Comedy Death-Ray compilation album. In 2008, Daly released the critically acclaimed Nine Sweaters, a comedy album compiled from a nine-week residency at Comedy Death-Ray's Tuesday night shows, on AST Records.

In December 2010, Daly performed stand-up on The Benson Interruption on Comedy Central.

Podcasting
Daly has made a number of appearances on podcasts such as Comedy Bang! Bang!, Superego, How Did This Get Made?, The Nerdist Podcast, Office Ladies, and Never Not Funny. In 2014, he began hosting the limited-run Earwolf podcast The Andy Daly Podcast Pilot Project, which continued in 2018 with a second season of 8 episodes. He currently hosts Bonanas for Bonanza on Comedy Bang! Bang! World. He is well known for his character Dalton Wilcox, which he plays on Comedy Bang! Bang! (TV show and podcast), Bonanas for Bonanza, The Andy Daly Podcast Pilot Project, Conan and other shows.

Personal life

Daly lives in Los Angeles and is married to actress Carri Levinson. They have two daughters.

Filmography

Film

Television

References

External links

Upright Citizens Brigade Theater Profile
Audio interview with Andy Daly on The Sound of Young America
Onion A.V. Club Random Roles interview with Andrew Daly

1971 births
Living people
20th-century American comedians
21st-century American comedians
American infotainers
American male comedians
American male film actors
American male television actors
American male television writers
American male voice actors
American sketch comedians
American stand-up comedians
Comedians from New Jersey
Comedians from New York (state)
Ithaca College alumni
Male actors from New Jersey
Male actors from New York (state)
People from Mount Kisco, New York
Ridgewood High School (New Jersey) alumni
Upright Citizens Brigade Theater performers